Lio Gangeri (Messina, June 1, 1845 – Salerno, February 5, 1913) was an Italian sculptor.

Life

First student of the painter Michele Panebianco from 1867 he moved to Rome where he studied under Giulio Monteverde. Later he worked in Italy but above all between Rome and in Messina.

Gangeri was the Professor and President of import Italian art academies like the Accademia di Belle Arti di Carrara and of the Accademia di Belle Arti di Roma. Among his students he remembers Arturo Dazzi.

He died in Salerno on February 5, 1913

References

1845 births
1913 deaths
19th-century Italian painters
19th-century Italian male artists
Italian male painters
20th-century Italian painters
20th-century Italian male artists